Damri or DAMRI may refer to:

 Perum DAMRI, a state owned public transit bus company in Jakarta, Indonesia
 Damri, Nepal